Sanne Brüel (12 April 1952 – 17 June 2011) was a Danish actress, composer and singer who, among other things. became known from DR's Christmas calendar Jullerup Færgeby, where she played Kaja.

Brüel was the twin sister of Rebecca Brüel, with whom she sang in Jomfru Ane Band. She was the mother of singer Kaya Brüel and the daughter of singer and actress Birgit Brüel and jazz musician and architect Max Brüel. Besides Rebecca, Sanne had half-sister Michaela and step-sister Puk.

References

External links

1952 births
2011 deaths
Actresses from Copenhagen
Musicians from Copenhagen
Singers from Copenhagen
20th-century Danish women singers
Danish women composers
Danish television actresses
Danish rock singers
21st-century Danish women singers